Tijane Freitas Reis (born 28 June 1991), simply known as Tijane, is a Portuguese professional footballer who plays for German club FSV Bernau as a left winger.

Club career
Tijane was born in Canchungo, Guinea-Bissau, but was raised in Conakry, due to war on his native country. He then had a brief period in S.L. Benfica's youth system, and later made his professional debuts with S.C. Mirandela. He also had a trial at Chelsea F.C., but nothing came of it. After a full season, he signed with G.D. Chaves.

Tijane made his Segunda Divisão debut on 6 November 2011, in a 3–1 home victory against Merelinense F.C. He scored his first goal on 29 April 2012, in a 4–3 home defeat against F.C. Vizela. In his second season, he contributed with 11 appearances and one goal, as Chaves was crowned champions. In August, he was linked to a host of clubs, the likes of Benfica, Stoke City F.C. and West Ham United F.C.

On 2 July 2013, Tijane signed a two-year deal with Swindon Town F.C. On 3 August, he made his professional debut, in a 1–0 away defeat against Peterborough United. On 10 September 2014, Mark Cooper announced Tijane had moved on from the club.

On 2 January 2015, Tijane signed a -year deal with G.D. Estoril Praia, returning to Portugal. He made his Primeira Liga debut on 22 February, coming on as a late substitute in a 2–1 home loss against Académica de Coimbra.

International career
After impressing with Segunda Liga side Chaves, Tijane made his international debut with Portugal U21 on 6 June 2012, in a 3–1 win against Albania.

References

External links

1991 births
Living people
People from Cacheu Region
Bissau-Guinean footballers
Portuguese footballers
Association football wingers
Primeira Liga players
Liga Portugal 2 players
SC Mirandela players
G.D. Chaves players
Swindon Town F.C. players
G.D. Estoril Praia players
Merelinense F.C. players
English Football League players
Portugal under-21 international footballers
Portuguese expatriate footballers
Bissau-Guinean expatriate footballers
Expatriate footballers in England
Portuguese expatriate sportspeople in England
Expatriate footballers in Germany
Portuguese expatriate sportspeople in Germany